A lens lantern is a small, self-contained lamp structure which may sometimes be used to serve as a lighthouse.  Unlike a regular Fresnel lens, the lantern requires no housing to protect it from the weather; its glass sides would refract and magnify the light in the same fashion as would the lens.  Lens lanterns were popular alternatives to lighthouses in the nineteenth century; they required less care, were cheaper to erect, and could be fairly easily placed.

References

See also
F. Ross Holland, Jr.  America's Lighthouses: Their Illustrated History Since 1716.

Lighthouse fixtures